Michael Dervan (19 May 1898 – 3 April 1981) was an Irish hurler. Usually lining out at corner-back, he was a member of the Galway team that won the 1923 All-Ireland Championship.

Dervan enjoyed a club career with Tynagh that yielded much success. After joining the club's senior team in his late teens he won five county championship medals in 1920, 1922, 1923, 1925 and 1928.

After being selected for the Galway senior team in 1922 he won a Connacht medal in his debut championship. He won his sole All-Ireland medal in 1923 after Galway's defeat of Limerick in the final. Dervan was a runner-up in three subsequent All-Ireland finals and two National Hurling League finals and retired from inter-county hurling in 1928.

As the top corner-back of his era, Dervan was included on the Ireland team at the Tailteann Games in 1924 and 1928, for which he was awarded gold medals.

In retirement from playing, Dervan came to be regarded as one of Galway's greatest ever players. He was named in the left corner-back position on the Galway Team of the Millennium. Dervan died after a short illness on 3 April 1981.

Honours

Tynagh
Galway Senior Hurling Championship (5): 1920, 1922, 1923, 1925, 1928

Galway
All-Ireland Senior Hurling Championship (1): 1923
Connacht Senior Hurling Championship (1): 1922

References

1898 births
1981 deaths
Tynagh hurlers
Galway inter-county hurlers
All-Ireland Senior Hurling Championship winners